Scarlet Pearl Casino Resort is a casino and hotel in D'Iberville, Mississippi.

The resort has 300 hotel rooms,  of gaming space,  including a newly built high limit area (opened late 2020) and amenities including a 36-hole miniature golf course, a buffet, and three other restaurants. The property also features a swimming pool and fitness center.

The project, originally named the Can Can Casino Resort and Spa, gained site approval from the Mississippi Gaming Commission in February 2010, but development stalled because of the Great Recession. Revised plans for the casino, by now known as the Scarlet Pearl, were approved by the commission in December 2013. Groundbreaking was held in July 2014. The property opened on December 9, 2015, at a cost of $290 million.

On October 1, 2019, the Scarlet Pearl's sportsbook took one of the largest bets in sports-betting history when they accepted Jim "Mattress Mack" Mcingvale's $3.5 million wager on the Houston Astros to win the 2019 World Series. In total, Mcingvale wagered $6.2 million at the Scarlet Pearl over the course of October, 2019 with all wagers on the Houston Astros to win the World Series.

See also
 List of casinos in Mississippi

References

External links
 

Casinos in Mississippi
Hotels in Mississippi
Buildings and structures in Harrison County, Mississippi
Tourist attractions in Harrison County, Mississippi
Casinos completed in 2015
Hotels established in 2015
2015 establishments in Mississippi
Casino hotels